Vitrinula chichijimana is an extinct species of air-breathing land snail, a terrestrial gastropod mollusk in the family Ariophantidae. This species was endemic to Japan.

References

Ariophantidae
Endemic fauna of Japan
Extinct gastropods
Extinct animals of Japan
Extinct invertebrates since 1500
Taxonomy articles created by Polbot